Parodia leninghausii is a species of South American cactus commonly found as a houseplant. Common names include lemon ball cactus, golden ball cactus and yellow tower cactus.

Botanist Karl Moritz Schumann named it after Wilhelm Lenninghaus (1845-1918), a native of North Rhine-Westphalia who, in the 1880s, left his hometown of Ennepetal and emigrated to Porto Alegre, Brazil, where he became Guillermo Lenninghaus, and collected cacti for the German grower Haage.

Parodia leninghausii is native to the Rio Grande do Sul province in the south of Brazil. In those regions, winter nights are cold, with a light freeze. These cacti survive in these conditions because they are quite dry at that time.

Parodia leninghausii shows cactus species nomadism; it was successively included in genus Pilocereus K. Schumann 1895, Malacocarpus (K.Schumann) Britton & Rose 1922, Notocactus (K.Schumann) A.Berger 1929, Eriocactus (K.Schumann) Backeberg 1942, and finally ended up in Parodia (K. Schumann) F.H.Brandt 1982.

Description
The species have many thin golden spines. The young plants are globular, then columnar up to 1m tall, 12 cm diameter and about 30 ribs. Old plants cluster from the base. Flowers are yellow, 5 cm diameter, at the top of the plants, but only if adult (at least 20 cm tall)

Sometimes, they present monstruous forms. There is a cultivar albispina with white spines.

Cultivation
Like most cacti, Parodia leninghausii needs well drained soil, sunny exposure, regular watering in summer and no watering in winter. In temperate climates, it may be placed outside in a warm sunny position during the summer months. In winter the plant tolerates frost at  if kept totally dry. In cultivation, it is preferable to keep a cold temperature, but more than  

This plant has won the Royal Horticultural Society's Award of Garden Merit.

References

Sources
 Anderson, Edward F. (2001) The Cactus Family Timber Press,  Portland, Oregon, pp. 544–545,

External links
 
  Photos on www.AIAPS.org
  photos on www.cactiguide.com
 IPNI Listing
 Kew Plant List

leninghausii
Flora of Brazil
Garden plants